Xu Jiatun (10 March 1916 – 29 June 2016) was a Chinese politician and dissident. He was the Chinese Communist Party secretary of Jiangsu Province from 1977 to 1983 and the Governor of Jiangsu from 1977 to 1979. After sympathising with the 1989 Tiananmen Square student protests, he left the country and lived in self-exile in the United States.

Career
Xu was the member of the 11th and 12th Central Committee of the Communist Party of China from 1977 to 1987. He was the Chinese Communist Party secretary of Jiangsu Province from 1977 to 1983 and the Governor of Jiangsu from 1977 to 1979. He became the director of the Hong Kong branch of the Xinhua News Agency from 1983 to 1989, then China's de facto political presence in the territory. He participated in the preparatory works of the establishment of the Hong Kong SAR and was vice-chairman of the Hong Kong Basic Law Drafting Committee.

Xu sympathised with the Tiananmen Square student protests in 1989. After the military crackdown in June, he fled to the United States and lived there in exile. He was later expelled from the Communist Party. In 1994, he published memoirs.
 
Xu later lived in Orange County, California, United States. In 1997, he joined an appeal to the Communist Party Congress meeting in Beijing to reverse the government report condemning the 1989 Tiananmen student protests. In a 2016 interview with the Hong Kong journalist Simon Kei Shek Ming, published in Initium Media, Xu, who had been recently released from hospital, predicted that Xi Jinping would arrest "higher level" tigers in the Communist Party. He died in June 2016 at the age of 100.

References 

1916 births
2016 deaths
Chinese centenarians
Chinese dissidents
Chinese emigrants to the United States
Chinese Communist Party politicians from Jiangsu
Delegates to the 5th National People's Congress
Expelled members of the Chinese Communist Party
Governors of Jiangsu
Hong Kong Basic Law Drafting Committee members
Members of the 12th Central Committee of the Chinese Communist Party
Men centenarians
People's Republic of China politicians from Jiangsu
People from Rugao
Politicians from Nantong
Xinhua News Agency people